Maundy Thursday (lit. Our Happy Time) is a 2006 South Korean film directed by Song Hae-sung based on a bestselling novel by Gong Ji-young. Starring Gang Dong-won and Lee Na-young, the film is about a convicted murderer awaiting execution, and the bond he forms with a suicidal young woman who starts visiting him in jail every Thursday.

With 3,132,320 admissions, Maundy Thursday was the seventh most popular Korean film of 2006.

Plot
Yu-jeong (Lee Na-young) has now attempted to commit suicide three times. Her disdain for her mother and indifference to the rest of the world isolates her from any chance for happiness. Yu-jeong's aunt Sister Monica is a nun, and she often goes to the prison to visit death row inmates. Sister Monica meets a new death row inmate who asks if he could meet her niece. Yu-jeong reluctantly agrees.

Yu-jeong and the death row inmate do not open up to each other immediately. Yu-jeong comes from a wealthy family and is a professor at a university. Yet, she has never known happiness since the age of 15 as a result of a sexual assault at the hands of her cousin. The inmate that she meets, named Yun-soo (Gang Dong-won), has had an even more traumatic childhood experience. He was abandoned by his parents at an early age and has had to live on the streets while caring for a younger brother. Eventually Yun-soo ends up involved in the criminal world and gets convicted for murder. With their disparate backgrounds, Yu-jeong and Yun-soo are still able to connect with each other, because both people have encountered grief like few others could possibly know. As they both regain the will to live through their weekly meetings, they must now deal with their feelings for each other and come to grips with the short amount of time they have together.

Cast 
 Gang Dong-won as Jung Yun-soo
 Lee Na-young as Moon Yu-jeong
 Youn Yuh-jung as Sister Monica, Yu-jeong's aunt
 Kang Shin-il as Manager Lee
 Jang Hyun-sung as Yu-chan, Yu-jeong's older brother
 Jung Young-sook as Yu-jeong's mother
 Kim Ji-young as Grandmother Park
 Kim Boo-seon as Hong
 Oh Kwang-rok as Death row inmate 2896
 Eun Won-jae as young Yun-soo (teen)
 Lee Byung-jun as young Yun-soo (child)
 Jung In-gi as Jung Min-seok
 Jung Jin as Tae-seong
 Yang Ik-june as Hwan-kyu
 Kim Jin-hyeok as prison guard A
 Kim Se-dong as prison guard Seo
 Lee Jae-gu as Teacher
 Oh Jung-se as Teacher Kim
 Kim So-hee as Yun-soo's mother
 Choi Jung-woo as uncle
 Kim Jae-man as gigolo
 Shin Young-jin as Yu-chan's wife
 Choi Moo-sung as Priest Kim
 Na Ki-soo as priest
 Kim Ja-young as housekeeper
 Choi Yong-min as President Choi

Awards and nominations
2006 Chunsa Film Art Awards
 Best Screenplay – Jang Min-seok, Park Eun-yeong

2006 Blue Dragon Film Awards
 Nomination – Best Actress – Lee Na-young
 Nomination – Best Music – Lee Jae-jin

2007 Baeksang Arts Awards
 Nomination – Best Actor – Gang Dong-won

References

External links 
  
 
 
 
 

2006 films
2006 romantic drama films
South Korean romantic drama films
South Korean prison films
2000s prison films
Incest in film
Films about capital punishment
Films based on South Korean novels
Films directed by Song Hae-sung
2000s Korean-language films
2000s South Korean films